Phillips is a lunar impact crater that is located in the vicinity of the Moon's east-southeastern limb, named after British geologist John Phillips. The larger walled plain Humboldt lies across the eastern rim of Phillips, and the outer rampart covers nearly half the interior floor. The surviving rim is eroded in places, and not quite circular.

The northern end of the crater's rim forms an outward-projecting bend, and the inner wall is diminished along that side. There is a small circular crater along the western rim. The interior floor is irregular in places, with a central ridge near the midpoint. To the southwest of Phillips lies the crater Legendre.

Satellite craters
By convention these features are identified on lunar maps by placing the letter on the side of the crater midpoint that is closest to Phillips.

References

External links

Impact craters on the Moon